Gina See-Yuen Wong is a filmmaker and founder of the Pineapple Underground Film Festival, which screens independent films from around the world. She also runs Experimenta, a performance art space in Hong Kong.

Career
In 2009, Wong directed the video short “Shanghai Saga: Other Skies, Other Lands.” The short film was selected in the International Competition section of the 55th International Short Film Festival Oberhausen. In 2011 she wrote, produced, and directed the documentary “Orient Top Down”.

She founded and curated the Pineapple Underground Film Festival (PUFF) in Hong Kong in 2011. PUFF is an independently funded, indie film festival as opposed to other film festivals in China which are run by the government. Wong works to promote independent cinema in Hong Kong and throughout China. The festival includes a side feature, Secret Cinema, which takes the films from the film festival to Shanghai, where it is illegal to hold a film festival. PUFF selects feature films, shorts and documentaries that would otherwise not be distributed in Hong Kong. The first festival featured films from Canada, the United States, Greece, Italy, and China, as well as Iran, Brazil, Taiwan, Norway, and Spain. The initial festival featured 26 films, and was up to 76 films by 2013.

Wong produced “The Lives of Hamilton Fish” and “The Road to South” in 2013.

Wong is also curator and co-founder of Experimenta, a digital media and performance art space in Hong Kong. The space features a projection screen and rows of wooden chairs for showing experimental cinema. Experimenta has hosted exhibitions of artists including João Vasco Paiva, Nadim Abbas, Susanne Buerner, Lam Hoi Sin, and Ho Sin Tung. In 2013, Wong co-produced a video art exhibition “The Personal and the Political” with Lam Hoi Sin. Wong was on the board of Para/Site Art Space.

Filmography 
 2009 Shanghai Saga: Other Skies, Other Lands - Short film. Director.
 2016 Papagajka - Associate producer

References

External links 
 Gina Wong at hku.hk

Film festival founders
Hong Kong film directors
Living people
Year of birth missing (living people)
Hong Kong women artists